The moustached laughingthrush (Ianthocincla cineracea) is a species of passerine bird in the family Leiothrichidae. It is found in China, India, and Myanmar where its natural habitat is subtropical or tropical moist montane forests.

The moustached laughingthrush was at one time placed in the genus Garrulax but following the publication of a comprehensive molecular phylogenetic study in 2018, it was moved to the resurrected genus Ianthocincla.

Subspecies
Three subspecies are recognised:
 I. c. cineracea (Godwin-Austen, 1874) – Patkai
 I. c. strenua (Deignan, 1957) – east Myanmar to Yunnan
 I. c. cinereiceps (Styan, 1887) – South China

References

External links
 Moustached laughingthrush videos on the Internet Bird Collection

moustached laughingthrush
Birds of the Patkai
Birds of South China
Birds of Yunnan
moustached laughingthrush
Taxonomy articles created by Polbot
Taxobox binomials not recognized by IUCN